Kátya Tompos (born Katalin Tompos March 13, 1983) is a Hungarian actress who was supposed to represent Hungary at the Eurovision Song Contest 2009 with the song "Magányos csónak". However, on 10 February 2009, Tompos announced her withdrawal from the 2009 Eurovision Song Contest due to theatrical commitments.

Filmography
 Coming Out'' (2013) - Linda
 Question in Details (Köntörfalak) (2010) - Eszti
 Poligamy (2009) – Lilla
 Valami Amerika 2 (2008) – Vivi
 Kire ütött ez a gyerek? (2007) - Borinka
 Bianco (2006)
 Régimódi történet (2006) - Kislenke
 A gyertyák csonkig égnek (2005)
 Melletted (2005)
 Szerelem meg hal (2003) - Hajnal

Awards
 Bárka Theatre - The best actress (public choice) 2007
 Erzsi Máté award 2005

References

External links
 Official website
 

1983 births
21st-century Hungarian women singers
Living people